Burritt may refer to:

Places
Burritt Township, Winnebago County, Illinois
Burritts Rapids, Ontario
Burritt on the Mountain museum and park in Huntsville, Alabama.

People
 Blackleach Burritt (1744–1794), patriot preacher during the American Revolutionary War 
 Bailey Barton Burritt (1878–1954), public health advocate
 David Burritt, American businessman, CEO of U.S. Steel
 Elihu Burritt (1810–1879), American philanthropist and social activist
 Stephen M. Burritt (1759–1844), early settler in eastern Ontario, Canada
 Henry Burritt (1791–1872), farmer and political figure in Upper Canada

Things
Burritts Rapids Bridge